The hooded red-sided opossum (Monodelphis palliolata) is a South American opossum species of the family Didelphidae. Until recently, it was viewed as a subspecies of M. brevicaudata. It is found in Colombia and Venezuela at altitudes from sea level to 2250 m. It is a primarily nonarboreal resident of tropical rainforest, but has also been seen in areas under cultivation.

References

Hooded red-sided opossum
Marsupials of South America
Mammals of Colombia
Mammals of Venezuela
Hooded red-sided opossum